Grapsus longitarsis is a species of decapod crustacean in the family Grapsidae, native to the Indo-Pacific. It was first described by James Dwight Dana in 1851, from a specimen found in the Tuamotu Archipeligo, French Polynesia.

The basis for the decision of synonymy is Banerjee (1960).

G. longitarsis is a tropical, benthic species living at depths ranging from 0–5 m in the intertidal zone.  Precopulatory courtship (via smell and touch) is common and the sperm transfer is usually indirect.

References 

Crustaceans described in 1825
Grapsidae